Getica was a historical book about the Getae tribes of Thrace which Suidas, Jordanes, and Freculphus attribute to Cassius Dio, while Philostratus sees Dio Chrysostom as its author. No copies of the book are known to exist.

See also
 Dacia

Notes

References 

Lost books
Books about Dacia